Uttarkashi Legislative Assembly constituency was a part of the Uttar Pradesh Legislative Assembly from 1974 to 2000. It became a part of the Interim Uttarakhand Assembly from 2000 to 2002.

Members of Legislative Assembly
Key

See also
 Gangotri (Uttarakhand Assembly constituency)
 Purola (Uttarakhand Assembly constituency)
 Yamunotri (Uttarakhand Assembly constituency)

References

Former assembly constituencies of Uttarakhand
Uttarkashi